Rajinder Krishan Duggal (6 June 1919 – 23 September 1987) also credited as Rajendra Krishan, was an Indian poet, lyricist and screenwriter.

Biography
Rajinder Krishan was born in a Duggal family at Jalalpur Jattan on 6 June 1919, in Gujrat District (in present-day Pakistan). Even when he was studying in the eighth class he was attracted towards poetry. In his early work life he had a clerk's job in the municipal office in Simla, where he toiled up to 1942. During that period, he read eastern and western authors extensively and wrote poetry. He expresses his indebtedness to the Urdu poetry of Firaq Gorakhpuri and Ahsan Danish, as well as to the Hindi poems of Pant and Nirala. In those days the newspapers in the Delhi-Punjab brought out special supplements and held poetry contests to mark Krishna Janmashtami, in which he participated regularly.

In the mid-1940s, Krishan shifted to Bombay (now Mumbai) to become a screenwriter in the Hindi film industry. His first screenplay was Janta (1947). His first film as a lyricist was Zanjeer (1947). He was first noted for the script and lyrics of the Motilal-Suraiya starrer Aaj Ki Rat (1948). After the assassination of Mahatma Gandhi, Krishan wrote a song Suno Suno Aye Duniyawalon, Bapu Ki Yeh Amar Kahani. The song was sung by Mohammed Rafi and composed by Husnlal Bhagatram, and was a great hit. He also tasted success as a lyricist with the films Badi Bahen (1949) and Lahore (1949).

Rajinder Krishan is known for his association with the composer C. Ramchandra. He worked with several other music directors including Shankar–Jaikishan, Ravi, Rajesh Roshan, Madan Mohan, Hemant Kumar, Sajjad Hussain, Sachin Dev Burman, Rahul Dev Burman, S. Mohinder, Chitragupta, Salil Chowdhury, and Laxmikant–Pyarelal.

Death and legacy
He died on 23 September 1987 in Mumbai. After his death, HMV brought out an LP containing 12 of his songs. He was known to keep a low profile and did not actively seek much publicity about himself. That's why many people that liked his penned songs, didn't know what he looked like due to a small number of available professional pictures of him.

Trivia
Rajinder Krishan was considered the richest writer in Hindi cinema. The reason was that he had won a jackpot worth 4,600,000 rupees in horse racing. The sum was considered a huge amount during the late seventies.

Awards
Rajinder Krishan won Filmfare Award for best lyricist for the movie Khandan (1965) for the song "Tumhi mere mandir, tumhi meri pooja".

Filmography

 
 Aag Ka Darya (1990) (lyrics)
 Allah Rakha (1986) (lyrics)
 Khel Mohabbat Ka (1986) (dialogue & story)
 Dharm Adhikari (1986) (dialogue)
 Silsila (1981) (lyrics)
 Ponga Pandit (1975) (dialogue)
 Naya Din Nai Raat (1974) (dialogue)
 Geeta Mera Naam (1974)
 Jwar Bhata (1973) (dialogue & lyrics)
 Banarasi Babu (1973) (lyrics)
 Blackmail (1973) (lyrics)
 Kahani Kismat Ki (1973) (lyrics)
 Bombay to Goa (1972) (dialogue)
 Maalik (1972) (dialogue)
 Shehzada (1972) (dialogue)
 Rakhwala (1971) (lyrics)
 Man Mandir (1971) (dialogue, screenplay, & lyrics)
 Reshma Aur Shera (1971) (lyrics)
 Gopi (1970) (dialogue & lyrics)
 Jawab (1970) (dialogue & lyrics)
 Tumse Achha Kaun Hai (1969) (lyrics)
 Doli (1969) (dialogue)
 Ek Shriman Ek Shrimati (1969) (dialogue)
 Pyar Ka Sapna (1969) (dialogue & lyrics)
 Sachaai (1969) (dialogue)
 Waris (1969) (dialogue)
 Brahmachari (1968) (lyrics)
 Gauri (1968) (dialogue)
 Padosan (1968) (dialogue, screenplay, & lyrics)
 Sadhu Aur Shaitaan (1968) (dialogue)
 Nai Roshni (1967) (dialogue & lyrics)
 Pyar Kiye Jaa (1966) (dialogue)
 Khandan (1965) (dialogue & lyrics)
 Main Bhi Ladki Hoon (1964) (dialogue & lyrics)
 Jahan Ara (1964) (lyrics)
 
 Aao Pyaar Karen (1964) (lyrics)
 Sharaabi (1964) (lyrics)
 Pooja Ke Phool (1964) (dialogue)
 Bharosa (1963) (dialogue & lyrics)
 Ghar Basake Dekho (1963) (screenplay, dialogue, lyrics)
 Yeh Raaste Hain Pyar Ke (1963) (lyrics)
 Bluff Master (1963) (dialogue)
 Man-Mauji (1962) (dialogue & lyrics)
 Prem Patra (1962) (dialogue)
 Rakhi (1962) (dialogue & lyrics)
 Shaadi (1962) (dialogue & lyrics)
 Chhaya (1961) (lyrics and dialogue)
 Nazrana (1961) (dialogue & lyrics)
 Bindya (1960) (dialogue)
 Love in Simla (1960) (lyrics)
 Maa Baap (1960) (dialogue)
 Patang (1960) (dialogue & lyrics)
 Barkha (1959) (dialogue)
 Adalat (1958) (lyrics)
 Jailor (1958) (lyrics)
 Gateway of India (1957) (lyrics)
 Asha (1957) (lyrics)
 Dekh Kabira Roya (1957) (lyrics)
 Bhai-Bhai (1956) (dialogue & lyrics)
 Taj (1956) (lyrics)
 Pehli Jhalak (1955) (dialogue)
 Azaad (1955) (lyrics)
 Pehli Jhalak (1955) (lyrics)
 Nagin (1954) (dialogue & lyrics)
 Anarkali (1953) (lyrics)
 Ladki (1953) (dialogue & lyrics)
 Sangdil (1952) (lyrics)
  Saqi 1952
 Aaram (1951) (lyrics)
 Albela (1951) (lyrics)
 Badi Bahen (1949) (lyrics and dialogue)
 Amar Kahani (1949) (lyrics)
 Aaj Ki Raat (1948) (script and lyrics)

Hindi film songs 

 Hum pyaar mein jalne walon ko -----Jailor
 Woh paas rahe ya dur-------------Badi Bahen
 Chup Chup Khadi Ho---------------Badi Bahen
 Ye zindagi usiki hai-------------Anarkali
 Jaag Dard-e-Ishq Jaag------------Anarkali
 Zindagi Pyar Ki Do Chaar Ghadi Hoti Hai---Anarkali
 Sham dhale khidki tale-----------Albela
 Mere piya gaye Rangoon-----------Patanga
 Yeh Hawa Yeh Raat Yeh Chandni----Sangdil
 Mera dil ye pukare aaja----------Nagin
 Na bole re na bole re------------Azaad
 Jahan daal daal par sone ki------Sikandar-E-Azam
 Rang dil ki dhadkan bhi----------Patang
 Aay dil mujhe bataa de-----------Bhai Bhai
 Kadar jane na--------------------Bhai Bhai
 Chal ud ja re panchhi------------Bhaabi
 Bhooli hui yaado----------------Sanjog
 Yuhn hasraton ke daag------------Adaalat
 Jana tha hum se dur--------------Adaalat
 Unko ye shikaayat hai------------Adaalat
 Zami se hume aasmaan par---------Adaalat
 Chhup gaya koi re dur se pukaar ke---Champakali
 Kaun Aaya, Mere Man Ke Dwaare----Dekh Kabira Roya
 Hum se aaya na gaya--------------Dekh Kabira Roya
 Meri veena tum bin---------------Dekh Kabira Roya
 Eena Meena Deeka-----------------Aasha
 Berahem aasmaan------------------Bahaana
 Maajhi meri kismat ke------------Hum Hindustani
 Ye mard bade bedard--------------Miss Mary
 Itna na mujhse tu pyar badha------Chhaya
 Aansoo samajh ke kiyun-----------Chhaya

 Mein apne aap se ghabra gaya-----Bindiya
 Is bhari duniya me---------------Bharosa
 Woh dil kahan se laaoon----------Bharosa
 Dil todna kisi ka----------------Pooja Ke Phool
 Meri aankhon se koi--------------Pooja Ke Phool
 Kabhi na kabhi kahin na kahin----Sharaabi
 Mein to tum sang nain mila ke----Man Mauji
 Phir wohi sham wohi gham---------Jahan Ara
 Mein teri nazar ka suroor hoon---Jahan Ara
 Teri aankh ke aansoo pee jaoon---Jahan Ara
 Is tarah toda mera dil-----------Shehnaai
 Kya ajab saaz hai ye shehnaai----Shehnaai
 Ye raaste hai pyar ke------------Ye Raaste Hai Pyar Ke
 Tumhi mere mandir----------------Khandaan
 Sapne hai sapne------------------Nai Roshni
 Kahena hai kahena hai------------Padosan
 Mere Saamnewali Khidki Mein------Padosan
 Kabhi kabhi aaisa bhi to---------Waris
 Jo unki tamanna------------------Inteqaam
 Sukh ke sab saathi---------------Gopi
 Pal pal dil ke paas--------------Black Mail
 Naina mere rang bhare sapne------Black Mail
 Jadugar tere naina---------------Man Mandir
 Chanda chhode chandni------------Khel Kismat Ka
 Mushkil hai jeena----------------Sahib Bahadur

References

External links
 

1919 births
1987 deaths
Indian male songwriters
Filmfare Awards winners
People from Shimla
Indian male screenwriters
Hindi-language lyricists
20th-century Indian composers
Screenwriters from Himachal Pradesh
20th-century Indian dramatists and playwrights
Hindi screenwriters
20th-century Indian male writers
20th-century male musicians
20th-century Indian screenwriters